Anacanthobythites is a genus of viviparous brotulas both found in the eastern Indian Ocean.

Species
There are currently two recognized species in this genus:
 Anacanthobythites platycephalus M. E. Anderson, 2008
 Anacanthobythites tasmaniensis M. E. Anderson, 2008

References

Bythitidae